Season 2008–09 was the 125th football season in which Dumbarton competed at a Scottish national level, entering the Scottish Football League for the 103rd time, the Scottish Cup for the 114th time, the Scottish League Cup for the 62nd time and the Scottish Challenge Cup for the 18th time.

Overview 
Jim Chapman's first full season in charge began with a large intake of new playing staff.  A slow start however was to be replaced by an unbeaten run of 8 games which saw Dumbarton rise to 2nd place by the beginning of November.  Mixed results in December through February meant that Dumbarton fell to 4th place, but still in with a playoff chance.  However it was to be a final surge which saw 7 wins taken from the last 8 games which pushed Dumbarton to the Third Division title.  Indeed that run brought about Dumbarton's record number of consecutive 'shut-outs' - 7 in all.

In the Scottish Cup, a second round victory over Highland League opponents Fraserburgh was followed by a close encounter with First Division Ross County, which was only decided by the odd goal in three and that after a draw.

In the League Cup, Dumbarton defeated Annan Athletic on penalties, but were to be overwhelmed by Premier Division St Mirren in the second round.

Finally, it was yet another League Challenge Cup first round exit, to Airdrie United.

Locally, the Stirlingshire Cup was not competed for.

Results & fixtures

Scottish Third Division

Alba Challenge Cup

Co-operative Insurance League Cup

Homecoming Scottish Cup

Pre-season

League table

Player statistics

Squad 

|}

Transfers

Players in

Players out

Trivia
 The League match against Annan Athletic on 9 May marked Andy Geggan's 100th appearance for Dumbarton in all national competitions - the 130th Dumbarton player to reach this milestone.

See also
 2008–09 in Scottish football

References

External links
Michael White (Dumbarton Football Club Historical Archive)
Richie McKillen (Dumbarton Football Club Historical Archive)
Michael O'Byrne (Dumbarton Football Club Historical Archive)
Gary Wilson (Dumbarton Football Club Historical Archive)
Kieran Brannan (Dumbarton Football Club Historical Archive)
Alan Gourlay (Dumbarton Football Club Historical Archive)
David Gray (Dumbarton Football Club Historical Archive)
Paul Craig (Dumbarton Football Club Historical Archive)
Liam Cusack (Dumbarton Football Club Historical Archive)
Nathan Taylor (Dumbarton Football Club Historical Archive)
Scottish Football Historical Archive

Dumbarton F.C. seasons
Scottish football clubs 2008–09 season